Calhoun is a surname of Irish origin. It is a variant of the Scottish surname Colquhoun. Notable people with this surname include:

In arts and entertainment
Alice Calhoun (1900–1966), American silent film actress
Ann Marie Calhoun (born 1979), American violinist
Chad Calhoun, a pseudonym of  Ron Goulart (born 1933), writer
Kutt Calhoun (born 1977), born Melvin Calhoun, musician
Monica Calhoun (born 1971), actress
Rory Calhoun (1922–1999), American actor
Will Calhoun (born 1964), American musician
William "Haystack" Calhoun (1934–1989), professional wrestler
William Henry Calhoun (1815–1865), American silversmith

In government, politics and activism
Bob Calhoun (1937–2020), American politician and lawyer
Bootsie Calhoun (1923–2014), American politician
Charles Calhoun Jr. (1931–2014), American politician and jurist
Cora Catherine Calhoun Horne (1865–1932) Black suffragist, civil rights activist, and an Atlanta socialite.
Floride Calhoun (1792–1866), wife of John C. Calhoun, second lady of the United States
James Calhoun (politician, born 1802) (1802–1852), Georgia politician, Army colonel, federal Indian agent, and Territorial Governor of New Mexico
John A. Calhoun (1918–2000), American diplomat
John C. Calhoun (1782–1850), United States politician and 7th Vice President
Riemer Calhoun (1909–1994), American politician
William Lowndes Calhoun (1837–1908), mayor of Atlanta, Georgia in 1879

In sport
Don Calhoun (born 1952), former professional American football running back
George Whitney Calhoun (1890–1963), co-founder of the Green Bay Packers NFL football team
Jermie Calhoun (born 1988), running back for the Oklahoma Sooners
Jim Calhoun (born 1942), head coach of the University of Connecticut men's basketball team
Kole Calhoun (born 1987), American Major League Baseball player
Lee Calhoun (1933–1989), American hurdler
Milo Calhoun (1940–1995), Jamaican boxer of the 1960s and '70s
Shaq Calhoun (born 1996), American football player
Thomas Calhoun (1795–1861), English clergyman and cricketer
William "Haystack" Calhoun (1934–1989), professional wrestler
Willie Calhoun (born 1994), American baseball player

In other fields
Cheshire Calhoun, American philosopher
Craig Calhoun (born 1952), American sociologist
David L. Calhoun (born 18 April 1957), American businessman, former chairman of The Boeing Company, appointed president and CEO-designate of Boeing on December 23, 2019
James Calhoun (soldier) (1845–1876), American soldier, killed at the Battle of Little Bighorn
John B. Calhoun (1917–1995), American ethologist

Fictional characters
Barney Calhoun, fictional character from the Half-Life computer game series
Mackenzie Calhoun, fictional character from Star Trek
Daltry Calhoun, the leading character of the 2005 movie of the same name
Noah Calhoun, fictional character played by Ryan Gosling in the 2004 movie "The Notebook" based on the novel by Nicholas Sparks
Chapped Lips Calhoun, a fictional character mentioned in the song "The Ballad of Chapped Lips Calhoun" in the 1997 game known as Grand Theft Auto.
Rutherford Calhoun, the protagonist of the novel Middle Passage by Charles Johnson
Sergeant Tamora J. Calhoun, the protagonist of the video arcade game "Hero's Duty" in the Disney animated film Wreck-It Ralph.
Anika Calhoun, fictional character played by Grace Gealey in Empire (2015 TV series)
Captain Cassius Calhoun, leading character of The Headless Horseman, an 1866 adventure novel by Mayne Reid
Coach Calhoun, fictional character in Grease
Coach Calhoun, fictional character in Big Nate
Dean Ernie Calhoun, fictional character in the YouTube web series Video Game High School
Roman Calhoun, fictional character in The Walking Dead

Americanized surnames